Anchicremna uncinata is a species of moth of the family Tortricidae. It is found in Peru.

The wingspan is about 27.5 mm. The ground colour of the forewings is brownish, strigulated (finely streaked) brown and creamish. The hindwings are cream, slightly tinged brownish terminally.

Etymology
The species name refers to the shape of termination of aedeagus and is derived from Latin uncus (meaning a hook).

References

Moths described in 2010
Sparganothini
Moths of South America
Taxa named by Józef Razowski